Greece competed at the 1936 Summer Olympics in Berlin, Germany. 41 competitors, 40 men and 1 woman, took part in 34 events in 7 sports. Greek athletes have competed in every Summer Olympic Games.

Athletics

Women's 80 metres hurdles
 Domnitsa Lanitou

Men's marathon
 Stylianos Kyriakides

Fencing

Eight fencers, all men, represented Greece in 1936.

Men's foil
 Nikolaos Manolesos
 Konstantinos Bembis
 Spyridon Ferentinos

Men's team foil
 Konstantinos Botasis, Spyridon Ferentinos, Konstantinos Bembis, Nikolaos Manolesos, Menelaos Psarrakis

Men's épée
 Khristos Zalokostas
 Konstantinos Bembis

Men's team épée
 Khristos Zalokostas, Konstantinos Botasis, Tryfon Triantafyllakos, Konstantinos Bembis

Men's sabre
 Nikolaos Manolesos
 Konstantinos Botasis
 Menelaos Psarrakis

Men's team sabre
 Nikolaos Manolesos, Nikolaos Paparrodou, Konstantinos Botasis, Menelaos Psarrakis

Modern pentathlon

One male pentathlete represented Greece in 1936.

 Alexandros Baltatzis-Mavrokorlatis

Shooting

Eight shooters represented Greece in 1936.

25 m rapid fire pistol
 Angelos Papadimas
 Christos Zalokostas
 Dimitrios Stathis

50 m pistol
 Georgios Stathis
 Georgios Kontogiannis

50 m rifle, prone
 Konstantinos Loudaros
 Athanasios Aravositas
 Georgios Vikhos

Swimming

Wrestling

Art competitions

References

External links
Official Olympic Reports

Nations at the 1936 Summer Olympics
1936
Summer Olympics